Nysson is a Holarctic genus of kleptoparasitic wasps in the family Crabronidae. Over 100 species are known.

European species 
Nysson alicantinus Mercet 1909
Nysson bohemicus Zavadil 1848
Nysson castellanus Mercet 1909
Nysson chevrieri Kohl 1879
Nysson dimidiatus Jurine 1807
Nysson dusmeti Mercet 1909
Nysson fraternus Mercet 1909
Nysson fulvipes A. Costa 1859
Nysson ganglbaueri Kohl 1912
Nysson gerstaeckeri Handlirsch 1887
Nysson hrubanti Balthasar 1972
Nysson ibericus Handlirsch 1895
Nysson interruptus (Fabricius 1798)
Nysson kolazyi Handlirsch 1887
Nysson konowi Mercet 1909
Nysson lapillus Beaumont 1965
Nysson laufferi Mercet 1904
Nysson maculosus (Gmelin 1790)
Nysson miegi Mercet 1909
Nysson mimulus Valkeila 1964
Nysson niger Chevrier 1868
Nysson parietalis Mercet 1909
Nysson pratensis Mercet 1909
Nysson pusillus Beaumont 1953
Nysson quadriguttatus Spinola 1808
Nysson roubali Zavadil 1937
Nysson ruthenicus Birula 1912
Nysson spinosus (J. Forster 1771)
Nysson susterai Zavadil 1948
Nysson tridens Gerstaecker 1867
Nysson trimaculatus (Rossi 1790)
Nysson varelai Mercet 1909
Nysson variabilis Chevrier 1867
Nysson decemmaculatus (Spinola 1808)
Nysson epeoliformis (F. Smith 1856)
Nysson militaris (Gerstaecker 1867)
Nysson monachus (Mercet 1909)

See also
 List of Nysson species

References

External links
Nysson images at  Consortium for the Barcode of Life
 Catalog of Sphecidae California Academy of Sciences Institute of Biodiversity

Crabronidae
Hymenoptera of Europe